Mark Kingdon may refer to:

Mark D. Kingdon, angel investor, former CEO of Linden Lab and Organic
Mark E. Kingdon, hedge fund manager and president of Kingdon Capital Management